Akash Bhandari (born 10 June 1993) is an Indian cricketer who plays for Hyderabad. In the 2016–17 Ranji Trophy match against Himachal Pradesh, he took four wickets for no runs, when Himachal Pradesh were bowled out in their first innings for 36.

References

External links
 

1993 births
Living people
Indian cricketers
Hyderabad cricketers
Cricketers from Hyderabad, India
Deccan Chargers cricketers